The Raipur–Naya Raipur  Expressway, also known as Atal Path Expressway, is an access-controlled, six-lane,  expressway connecting Raipur to Naya Raipur in the state of Chhattisgarh in India. It has been made to ease the traffic in the GE road, or NH-53, and provide faster access to Dhamtari road from Raipur Junction Railway Station. It serves 4 flyovers and 1 elevated corridor crossing over the GE road in between two ends of expressway.

Roads in Chhattisgarh
Expressways in Chhattisgarh
Transport in Raipur district
Transport in Raipur, Chhattisgarh